Magnus Mwalunyungu (August 25, 1930 – February 13, 2015) was a Roman Catholic bishop.

Ordained to the priesthood in 1959, Mwalunyungu was named bishop of the Roman Catholic Diocese of Tunduru-Masasi, Tanzania in 1992 and retired in 2005.

Notes

1930 births
2015 deaths
20th-century Roman Catholic bishops in Tanzania
21st-century Roman Catholic bishops in Tanzania
Roman Catholic bishops of Tunduru–Masasi